The 2016 AYA Bank Cup was a four-nation football tournament hosted in Yangon, Myanmar from 3–6 June 2016.

The tournament followed a straight knockout format with Vietnam and Hong Kong facing in the first semi-final and the first match of the tournament followed by a match between hosts Myanmar and Singapore.

Ayeyarwady Bank was the title sponsor of the tournament which signed a contract with the Myanmar Football Federation on 4 May 2016.

Venue

Results
 Times listed are local (UTC+6:30)

Semi-finals

Third place match

Final

Winners

See also

 KBZ Bank U-19 Cup 2016

References

2016 in Burmese football
International association football competitions hosted by Myanmar
2016 in Vietnamese football
2016 in Hong Kong sport
2016 in Singaporean football